Dirk De Smet (born 30 April 1969 in Kapellen, Belgium) is a Flemish singer and saxophonist, best known for winning the second series of the Belgian edition of X Factor musical competition. He won the title on the final held on 17 December 2008 with 53% of the popular vote against the other finalist, Tom Eeckhout (later known as Tom Dice).

Dirk De Smet released the winning single on 18 December 2008 entitled "Walk and Don't Look Back", a remake of The Temptations' hit "Don't Look Back". De Smet's version reached #4, its highest position on the Belgian music charts on 27 December 2008.

Discography

Singles

References

External links
Dirk De Smet Official website

1969 births
Living people
Belgian pop singers
Belgian saxophonists
The X Factor winners
People from Kapellen, Belgium
21st-century saxophonists